One Day or 1 Day may refer to:

Film
 One Day (1991 film), a British television film by Helen Edmundson in the anthology series ScreenPlay
 One Day, a 2007 film featuring Hayley Carmichael
 1 Day, a 2009 British film
 One Day (2010 film), a Taiwanese film starring Chang Shu-hao
 One Day (2011 film), an adaptation of David Nicholls's novel (see below), directed by Lone Scherfig
 One Day (2016 film), a Thai film by Banjong Pisanthanakun
 One Day (2017 film), a South Korean film by Lee Yoon-ki
 One Day: Justice Delivered, a 2019 Indian Hindi film directed by Ashok Nanda

Literature
 One Day (novel), a 2009 novel by David Nicholls

Music

Bands
 One Day (band), an Australian hip hop collective
 One Day (South Korean band), a 10-member South Korean band, split into bands 2AM and 2PM

Albums
 One Day (Klymaxx album) or the title song, 1994
 One Day (Northern Lights album) or the title song, 2008
 One Day (Peter Toussaint album), 2017
 One Day (Fucked Up album), 2023
 One Day, by Maximilian Hecker, 2009
 One Day (single album), by One, 2017

Songs
 "One Day" (2AM and 2PM song), 2012
 "One Day" (Arash song), 2014
 "One Day" (Caro Emerald song), 2013
 "One Day" (Charice song), 2011
 "One Day" (Kodaline song), 2014
 "One Day" (Logic song), 2018
 "One Day" (Mariette song), 2023
 "One Day" (Matisyahu song), 2008
 "One Day" (Opshop song), 2007
 "One Day" (Vince Clarke and Paul Quinn song), 1985
 "One Day (Vandaag)", by Bakermat, 2012
 "One Day / Reckoning Song", a remix by Wankelmut of "Reckoning Song" by Asaf Avidan, 2012
 "Un Día (One Day)", by J Balvin, Dua Lipa, Bad Bunny and Tainy, 2020
 "One Day", by 2 Brothers on the 4th Floor, 1997
 "One Day", by Ace of Base from The Golden Ratio, 2010
 "One Day", by Björk from Debut, 1993
 "One Day", by Chris Isaak from Always Got Tonight, 2002
 "One Day", by Delta Goodrem from Delta, 2007
 "One Day", by Donna De Lory from In the Glow, 2003
 "One Day", by Electric Light Orchestra from Zoom, 2001
 "One Day", by Fabolous from Ghetto Fabolous, 2001
 "One Day", by Fishbone from Truth and Soul, 1988
 "One Day", by Genesis from From Genesis to Revelation, 1969
 "One Day", by the Guess Who from It's Time, 1966
 "One Day", by Imagine Dragons from Mercury – Act 1, 2021
 "One Day", by Kamelot from The Expedition, 2000
 "One Day", by Kissing the Pink (KTP) from Certain Things Are Likely, 1986
 "One Day", by Kodaline from In a Perfect World, 2013
 "One Day", by Little River Band from The Net, 1983
 "One Day", by LMFAO from Sorry for Party Rocking, 2011
 "One Day", by Lovejoy, 2021
 "One Day", by Monsta X, 2021
 "One Day", by Nik Kershaw from To Be Frank, 2001
 "One Day", by O.A.R. from All Sides, 2008
 "One Day", by P.O.D. from Brown, 1996
 "One Day", by Roger Daltrey from Parting Should Be Painless, 1984
 "One Day", by Simple Plan from No Pads, No Helmets...Just Balls, 2002
 "One Day", by Sissel Kyrkjebø from All Good Things, 2000
 "One Day", by Toby Lightman from Let Go, 2008
 "One Day", by TQ from The Second Coming, 2000
 "One Day", by Trading Yesterday, 2005
 "One Day", by UGK from Ridin' Dirty, 1996
 "One Day", by Uriah Heep from Sweet Freedom, 1973
 "One Day", by the Verve from Urban Hymns, 1997
 "One Day", by Zac Brown Band from Jekyll + Hyde, 2015
 "One Day", from the film soundtrack album Pirates of the Caribbean: At World's End, 2007
 "One Day", a hymn written by John Wilbur Chapman, 1910
 "One Day (At a Time)", by John Lennon from Mind Games, 1973
 "One Day (I'm Gonna Make You Mine)", by Sheila E. from Sheila E., 1987

See also

One-day cricket or limited overs cricket
A Day (disambiguation)